The Centre Culturel Mustapha Kateb  (Arabic: المركز الثقافي مصطفى كاتب) is a cultural center in Algiers, Algeria. Its former name was Centre de Loisirs Scientifiques (الاسم السابق).

External links 
Centre de Loisirs Scientifiques (CLS) sur GOOGLE Map
Google Maps (English)

Buildings and structures in Algiers